Seán na Sagart (John of the Priests in Irish) ( – 1726) was a priest hunter during Penal Times in Ireland.

Born John O'Mullowny in Derrew, near Ballyheane, County Mayo, he began his career as a horse thief but was arrested and sentenced to death in Castlebar in his youth. When the grand jury became aware of his low character, they cut a deal with him in which he agreed to turn priest hunter to escape the hangman's noose. The 1709 Penal Act demanded that Catholic priests take the Oath of Abjuration and recognise the Protestant Queen Anne as Supreme Head of the Church of England and Ireland. Any cleric that refused was sentenced to death by the Anglican-controlled judicial system.

O'Mullowney was a talented rogue and excelled at the activity of hunting clergy. He received £100 for the capture of an archbishop or bishop, £20 for a priest, and £10 for obtaining a hedge school teacher, and £5 for a priest in training; sizable amounts at the time. These men would then be executed if they refused to take the Act of Abjuration. O'Mullowney used the money to fund his heavy drinking and expensive tastes. One technique used by him was to pretend to be sick and close to death. He would then call for a priest to confess his numerous sins. When a priest would arrive, O'Mullowny would grab a knife hidden under the bedclothes, and attempt to capture or kill his confessor.

O'Mullowny was a deeply unpopular individual, and hated by all. He murdered with steady success until he had killed all but two of the area priests. The last two knew well who he was and lived in disguise. But O'Mullowny discovered one of the last two and killed him. He expected that the last remaining priest would attend that funeral, which he did, dressed as a woman. The priest's disguise did not fool O'Mullowny, who attacked him at the funeral. Unlike other priests who had been ambushed by someone whom they thought was dying, this priest was expecting an attack and fought back. He was able to hold off Mullowney long enough for a homeless man known as McCann to stab Mullowney and kill him. He is said to be buried in the graveyard at Ballintubber Abbey.

References

Sources
 De Burca, Eamon (1987). South Mayo Family Research Centre Journal.
 Nugent, Tony (2013), Were You at the Rock? The History of Mass Rocks in Ireland, The Liffey Press.

External links
Sean Na Sagart
Photograph of The Tree of Sean na Sagart

1690s births
1726 deaths
People from County Mayo
Priest hunters